Almejuq-e Sofla (also Romanized as Almejūq-e Soflá; also known as Almejoq-e Pā’īn and Almejūq-e Pā’īn) is a village in Jolgeh-ye Musaabad Rural District, in the Central District of Torbat-e Jam County, Razavi Khorasan Province, Iran. At the 2006 census, its population was 895, in 184 families.

See also 

 List of cities, towns and villages in Razavi Khorasan Province

References 

Populated places in Torbat-e Jam County